Charles Morgan (10 August 1900 – 8 December 1965) was an Australian cricketer. He played one first-class cricket match for Victoria in 1927.

See also
 List of Victoria first-class cricketers

References

External links
 

1900 births
1965 deaths
Australian cricketers
Victoria cricketers
Cricketers from Melbourne